The 12th Army Aviation Brigade is an army aviation formation of the Ukrainian Ground Forces. The brigade is directly subordinated to the Ukrainian Ground Forces command.

The brigade was formed as 340th Separate Combat-Transport Helicopter Breslavlsk Regiment.
From August 21, 1968 to June 1991 the Regiment was stationed in Czechoslovakia.
After 1992 the Regiment was redesignated to be 7th Separate Breslavlsk Army Aviation Regiment. In 2016 it became the 12th Army Aviation Brigade.

History 
The brigade was first formed in April 1943 as the 340th Long-Range Aviation Regiment. On 26 December 1944 it became a bomber aviation regiment. On 27 April 1946 it became a transport aviation regiment. On 12 October 1955 it became a military-transport aviation regiment. It was converted to a separate helicopter regiment on 17 November 1959.

The regiment's honorific "Breslau (Breslavlsk)" was removed on 18 November 2015 as part of an Armed Forces-wide removal of Soviet awards and honorifics.

It became the 12th Army Aviation Brigade in 2016.

Deployments
Since November 2007, 300 members of the Regiment are deployed to Liberia, supporting the United Nations Mission in Liberia, as part of the 56th Separate Helicopter Unit.

Structure
During the 1970s the Regiment included 4 Squadron's with a total of 55-60 helicopters.

In 2004 the Brigade consisted of 2 Squadron's flying Mi-24, Mi-26 and Mi-8 helicopters.

2nd Squadron is intended to carry out missions under UN and NATO command.

Equipment
Equipment in 2004
 Mi-24B - 6
 Mi-24P - 15
 Mi-24VP - 3
 Mi-24R - 3
 Mi-24K - 7
 Mi-8T - 26
 Mi-8MT - 3
 Mi-8MTV-2 - 4
 Mi-9 - 6
 Mi-26 - 16

References

Brigades of the Ukrainian Ground Forces
Military units and formations established in 2016